West Virginia Route 24 is a north–south state highway located within Preston County in the U.S. state of West Virginia. The southern terminus of the route is at U.S. Route 219 in Silver Lake. The northern terminus is at U.S. Route 50 in Brookside.

Major intersections

References

024
Transportation in Preston County, West Virginia